Diplacus pulchellus is an uncommon species of monkeyflower known by the common name yellowlip pansy monkeyflower. It was formerly known as Mimulus pulchellus.

Description
Diplacus pulchellus is a petite annual herb growing in small tufts or patches on the ground with hardly any stem. The oppositely arranged leaves are linear in shape and up to 3.5 centimeters long. The flower is 2 to 4 centimeters long and funnel-shaped, with a very narrow tubular base and very wide mouth. The flower is divided into an upper lip with two lobes and a lower with three. It is bicolored, the upper lip lavender to purple and the lower lip golden yellow; sometimes only the wide middle lobe of the lower lip is yellow. The hairy mouth of the flower is usually spotted and speckled with purple.

Distribution
Diplacus pulchellus is endemic to the Sierra Nevada foothills of California, where it can be found at vernal pools, meadows, and other wet, open habitat.

References

External links
Jepson Manual Treatment - Mimulus pulchellus
USDA Plants Profile
Mimulus pulchellus - Photo gallery

pulchellus
Endemic flora of California
Flora of the Sierra Nevada (United States)
Flora without expected TNC conservation status